William Ignatius Burke (July 11, 1889 – February 9, 1967) is a former Major League Baseball pitcher. He played two seasons with the Boston Doves / Rustlers from 1910 to 1911.

References

External links

Boston Doves players
Boston Rustlers players
Montreal Royals players
Notre Dame Fighting Irish baseball players
Major League Baseball pitchers
1889 births
1967 deaths
Baseball players from Massachusetts
People from Clinton, Massachusetts
Sportspeople from Worcester County, Massachusetts
Seton Hall Pirates baseball players